The state highway system in the U.S. state of California dates back to 1896, when the state took over maintenance of the Lake Tahoe Wagon Road. Before then, roads and streets were managed exclusively by local governments. The last large addition was made by the California State Assembly in 1959, after which only minor changes have been made.

1895 to 1919

The 58 mile (93 km) road had been operated as a toll road until 1886, when El Dorado County bought it; the county deeded the road to the state on February 28, 1896. Funding was only enough for minimal improvements, including a stone bridge over the South Fork American River in 1901.

Also in 1895, on March 27, the legislature created the three-person Bureau of Highways to coordinate efforts by the counties to build good roads. The bureau traveled to every county of the state in 1895 and 1896 and prepared a map of a recommended system of state roads, which they submitted to the governor on November 25, 1896. The legislature replaced the Bureau of Highways with the Department of Highways on April 1, 1897, three days after it passed a law creating a second state highway from Sacramento to Folsom — another part of what became US 50 — to be maintained by three "Folsom Highway Commissioners". This was the last highway maintained by a separate authority, as the next state road, the Mono Lake Basin State Road (now part of SR 120), was designated by the legislature in 1899 to be built and maintained by the Department of Highways.

Several more state highways were legislated in the next decade, and the legislature passed a law creating the Department of Engineering on March 11, 1907. This new department, in addition to non-highway duties, was to maintain all state highways, including the Lake Tahoe Wagon Road. On March 22, 1909, the "State Highways Act" was passed, taking effect on December 31, 1910, after a successful vote by the people of the state in November. This law authorized the Department of Engineering to issue $18 million in bonds for a "continuous and connected state highway system" that would connect all county seats. To this end, the department created the three-member California Highway Commission on August 8, 1911, to take full charge of the construction and maintenance of this system. Construction began in mid-1912, with groundbreaking on Contract One — now part of SR 82 in San Mateo County — occurring on August 7. Noteworthy portions of the system built by the commission included the Ridge Route in southern California and the Yolo Causeway west from Sacramento.

Because the first bond issue did not provide enough funding, the "State Highways Act of 1915" was approved by the legislature on May 20, 1915, and the voters in November 1916, taking effect on December 31. This gave the Department of Engineering an additional $12 million to complete the original system and $3 million for a further approximately  specified by the law. At this time, each route was assigned a number from 1 to 34; this system of labeling routes, although never marked with signs, remained until the 1964 renumbering. In 1917, the legislature gave the California Highway Commission statutory recognition, and turned over the approximately 750 miles (1200 km) of roads adopted by legislative act, until then maintained by the State Engineer, to the commission. Where not serving as extensions of existing routes, these - and routes subsequently added legislatively in 1917 and 1919 - were given numbers from 35 to 45. The three bond issues together totaled , of which just over 40% (60% if the 1919 bond issue is left out) was completed or under construction in mid-1920.

1920 to 1958

The Department of Engineering became part of the new Department of Public Works in 1921, and the California Highway Commission was entirely separated as its own department in 1923. In order to pay for the roads, a 2-cent per gallon gasoline tax was approved in 1923. The legislature continued to add highways to the system, including the Mother Lode Highway (now part of SR 49) in 1921 and the Arrowhead Trail (now I-15 north of Barstow) in 1925. In January 1928, the California State Automobile Association and Automobile Club of Southern California, which had already been placing guide and warning signs along state highways, marked the U.S. Highways along several of the most major state highways. The California Toll Bridge Authority was created in 1929 to acquire and operate all toll bridges on state highways, including the San Francisco–Oakland Bay Bridge and Carquinez Bridge.

After 1927 and 1929, in which no highways were added to the system, the legislature authorized the construction of 23 new routes in 1931, which were numbered from 72 to 80 when not forming extensions of existing routes. Many of these new routes, as well as a number of existing routes, were incorporated into the initial system of state sign routes in 1934, also posted by the auto clubs.

The Division of Highways took over signage on state highways from the auto clubs in 1947, though at least the Auto Club of Southern California continued to place signs on city streets until 1956.

The "Great Renumbering" of 1964

In 1963 and 1964, the California Division of Highways implemented a major renumbering of its state highways. The majority of sign routes — those marked for the public — kept their numbers; the main changes were to the legislative routes, which had their numbers changed to match the sign routes. A large number of formerly unsigned routes received sign numbers corresponding to their new legislative numbers. A smaller change was the removal and truncating of many U.S. Routes in favor of the Interstate Highways (designated in 1959), and the renumbering of State Routes that conflicted with Interstate numbers. Some U.S. Routes that were officially removed continued to be signed until the replacement Interstates were completed. The state law authorizing the renumbering was passed on September 20, 1963. Signage changes took place by July 1, 1964.

1964 to present

A regularly recurring issue in California politics since the 1960s was whether the state should continue to aggressively expand its freeway network or concentrate on improving mass transit networks. Freeway revolts sprang up across the state in the 1960s and 1970s, killing or delaying several projects such as a freeway in San Francisco between the Golden Gate Bridge and the San Francisco–Oakland Bay Bridge, and an expansion of Interstate 710 through South Pasadena.

Both the National Environmental Policy Act of 1969 and the California Environmental Quality Act of 1970 added significant environmental regulations to highway construction. Then in 1972, the Department of Public Works was merged with the Department of Aeronautics to become the modern California Department of Transportation (Caltrans). Now Caltrans not only manages the state highway system, but is also actively involved with public transportation systems throughout the state, and thus is essentially in charge of the entire state's transportation network.

Toll roads and high-occupancy toll lanes began to open across the state beginning in the 1990s. The decade also saw the implementation of FasTrak, California's electronic toll collection (ETC) system, across all toll facilities on state highways. The 91 Express Lanes opened in 1995 along State Route 91 between Anaheim and the Riverside County line, developed as a partnership between Caltrans and the private California Private Transportation Company (CPTC). The Transportation Corridor Agencies, a local agency created by the state, also established three toll roads in Orange California in the 1990s. Another privately financed toll highway project, the South Bay Expressway, began operation in San Diego County in 2007. Several of these other HOT lanes across various state highway are also either currently under construction or in the planning stages that will open in the near future.

List of route numbers, 1917-1931

See also

 Butterfield Overland Mail
 California Trail
 El Camino Real (California)
 El Camino Viejo
 Rincon Sea Level Road
 Southern Emigrant Trail
 Stockton – Los Angeles Road

Notes

References
Department of Engineering, Fifth Biennial Report of the Department of Engineering of the State of California, December 1, 1914, to November 30, 1916, 1917
Ben Blow, California Highways: A Descriptive Record of Road Development by the State and by Such Counties as Have Paved Highways, 1920 (Archive.org or Google Books)
Howe & Peters, Engineers' Report to California State Automobile Association Covering the Work of the California Highway Commission for the Period 1911-1920
Automobile Club of Southern California and California State Automobile Association, The State Highways of California: An Engineering Study, 1921

Further reading

.History
History of transportation in California
Road transportation in California